Sir John Bertrand Gurdon  (born 2 October 1933) is a British developmental biologist. He is best known for his pioneering research in nuclear transplantation and cloning. He was awarded the Lasker Award in 2009. In 2012, he and Shinya Yamanaka were awarded the Nobel Prize for Physiology or Medicine for the discovery that mature cells can be converted to stem cells.

Early days

Gurdon attended Edgeborough and then Eton College, where he ranked last out of the 250 boys in his year group at biology, and was in the bottom set in every other science subject. A schoolmaster wrote a report stating, "I believe he has ideas about becoming a scientist; on his present showing this is quite ridiculous." Gurdon explains it is the only document he ever framed; Gurdon also told a reporter, "When you have problems like an experiment doesn't work, which often happens, it's nice to remind yourself that perhaps after all you are not so good at this job and the schoolmaster may have been right."

Gurdon went to Christ Church, Oxford, to study classics but switched to zoology. For his DPhil degree he studied nuclear transplantation in a frog species of the genus Xenopus with Michael Fischberg at Oxford. Following postdoctoral work at Caltech, he returned to England and his early posts were at the Department of Zoology of the University of Oxford (1962–71).

Gurdon had spent much of his research career at the University of Cambridge, first at the MRC Laboratory of Molecular Biology (1971–83) and then at the Department of Zoology (1983–present). In 1989, he was a founding member of the Wellcome/CRC Institute for Cell Biology and Cancer (later Wellcome/CR UK) in Cambridge, and was its Chair until 2001. He was a member of the Nuffield Council on Bioethics 1991–1995, and Master of Magdalene College, Cambridge, from 1995 to 2002.

Research

Nuclear transfer
In 1958, Gurdon, then at the University of Oxford, successfully cloned a frog using intact nuclei from the somatic cells of a Xenopus tadpole. This work was an important extension of work of Briggs and King in 1952 on transplanting nuclei from embryonic blastula cells and the successful induction of polyploidy in the stickleback, Gasterosteus aculatus, in 1956 by Har Swarup reported in Nature. At that time he could not conclusively show that the transplanted nuclei derived from a fully differentiated cell. This was finally shown in 1975 by a group working at the Basel Institute for Immunology in Switzerland. They transplanted a nucleus from an antibody-producing lymphocyte (proof that it was fully differentiated) into an enucleated egg and obtained living tadpoles.

Gurdon's experiments captured the attention of the scientific community as it altered the notion of development and the tools and techniques he developed for nuclear transfer are still used today. The term clone (from the ancient Greek word κλών (klōn, "twig")) had already been in use since the beginning of the 20th century in reference to plants. In 1963 the British biologist J. B. S. Haldane, in describing Gurdon's results, became one of the first to use the word "clone" in reference to animals.

Messenger RNA expression
Gurdon and colleagues also pioneered the use of Xenopus (genus of highly aquatic frog) eggs and oocytes to translate microinjected messenger RNA molecules, a technique which has been widely used to identify the proteins encoded and to study their function.

Recent research
Gurdon's recent research has focused on analysing intercellular signalling factors involved in cell differentiation, and on elucidating the mechanisms involved in reprogramming the nucleus in transplantation experiments, including the role of histone variants, and demethylation of the transplanted DNA.

Politics and religion
Gurdon has stated that he is politically "middle of the road", and religiously agnostic because "there is no scientific proof either way". During his tenure as Master of Magdalene College, Gurdon created some controversy when he suggested that fellows should occasionally be allowed to deliver "an address on anything they would like to talk about" in college chapel services. In an interview with EWTN.com, Gurdon reports that "I'm what you might call liberal minded. I'm not a Roman Catholic. I'm a Christian, of the Church of England."

Honours and awards
Gurdon was elected to the American Academy of Arts and Sciences in 1978, the United States National Academy of Sciences in 1980, and the American Philosophical Society in 1983. Gurdon was made a Fellow of the Royal Society (FRS) in 1971, and was knighted in 1995. In 2004, the Wellcome Trust/Cancer Research UK Institute for Cell Biology and Cancer was renamed the Gurdon Institute in his honour. He has also received numerous awards, medals and honorary degrees. In 2005, he was elected as an Honorary Member of the American Association of Anatomists. He was awarded the 2009 Albert Lasker Basic Medical Research award and in 2014 delivered the Harveian Oration at the Royal College of Physicians. In 2017, Gurdon received the Golden Plate Award of the American Academy of Achievement.

Nobel Prize
In 2012, Gurdon was awarded, jointly with Shinya Yamanaka, the Nobel Prize for Physiology or Medicine "for the discovery that mature cells can be reprogrammed to become pluripotent". His Nobel Lecture was called "The Egg and the Nucleus: A Battle for Supremacy".

References

External links

 Interviewed by Alan Macfarlane 20 August 2008 (video)
Wolf Prize in Medicine 1978–2008 edited by John Gurdon (book) including Chapter 1: John B Gurdon (1989) (pdf, 6 Mb)
Cloning and Stem Cell Discoveries Earn Nobel in Medicine (New York Times, 8 October 2012)
 (7 December 2012)

1933 births
Alumni of Christ Church, Oxford
20th-century British biologists
21st-century British biologists
Developmental biologists
British Nobel laureates
English Nobel laureates
Fellows of Churchill College, Cambridge
Fellows of the Royal Society
Fullerian Professors of Physiology
British Anglicans
British agnostics
Knights Bachelor
Living people
Masters of Magdalene College, Cambridge
Members of the French Academy of Sciences
Foreign associates of the National Academy of Sciences
Nobel laureates in Physiology or Medicine
People educated at Eton College
Place of birth missing (living people)
Recipients of the Copley Medal
Royal Medal winners
Wolf Prize in Medicine laureates
Recipients of the Albert Lasker Award for Basic Medical Research
Articles containing video clips
John Humphrey Plummer Professors
Members of the American Philosophical Society
Members of the National Academy of Medicine